Alvin McBurney (July 1, 1908 – February 24, 2004), known by his stage name Alvino Rey, was an American jazz guitarist and bandleader.

Career
Alvin McBurney was born in Oakland, California, United States, but grew up in Cleveland, Ohio. Early in life he had a knack for music and electronics. When he was eight, he built his first radio, and within a couple years he was one of the youngest ham radio operators in the country. In his teens, he was given a banjo as a birthday present. His professional career began in 1927 when he got a job playing banjo with Cleveland bandleader Ev Jones. During the following year, he became a member of the Phil Spitalny Orchestra. He switched from banjo to guitar, then changed his name to Alvino Rey to take advantage of the popularity of Latin music in New York City at the time.

From 1932 to 1938 he was a member of Horace Heidt and His Musical Knights. He drew attention to himself and the band when he started playing steel guitar. The Gibson corporation asked him to develop a pickup for the guitar. In 1937, he married Luise King of the King Sisters.

In 1939, he formed his own band with the King Sisters and moved to Hollywood, where he became musical director at KHJ Mutual Broadcasting radio network. As leader of the house band, he recorded a version of "Deep in the Heart of Texas" that was a hit in 1942. During the same year he hired Al Cohn, Ray Conniff, Neal Hefti, Zoot Sims, and arranger Billy May. In the 1940s he also worked with saxophonist Herbie Steward, drummer Dave Tough, and arrangers Nelson Riddle, Johnny Mandel, and George Handy.

The band did not record in 1943 due to the musicians' strike. The band broke up, and Rey found work at Lockheed as a mechanic. In 1944, he enlisted in the U.S. Navy, where he worked on radar systems and directed a band. After his service, he formed an orchestra that had fifteen horns and recorded a cover version of "Cement Mixer" by Slim Gaillard that became a hit. During the 1950s, he played steel guitar in small groups, often with Buddy Cole, his brother-in-law.

Beginning about 1957, Rey produced many of the George Greeley piano recordings for Warner Bros. Records.

During the 1960s, he was music director for The King Family Show with the King Sisters. Rey made frequent appearances on the show performing "The Alvino Rey Talking Guitar" which was in fact a pedal steel. He also played steel guitar in recording sessions with Jack Costanzo, George Cates, Esquivel, and the studio group the Surfmen. These musicians were associated with the short-lived genre exotica, which combined Hawaiian music, Latin music, lounge jazz, and unconventional instruments from Burma and Indonesia. In 1978, he was inducted into the Steel Guitar Hall of Fame.

In the early 1990s, Rey moved with his wife Luise to her native Utah. In Salt Lake City, he formed a jazz quartet which played in local clubs, sometimes with Luise sitting in. He retired from performing in 1994. Luise died in 1997 after 60 years of marriage. In 2004, after breaking his hip and suffering complications including pneumonia and congestive heart failure, Rey died at the age of 95 at a rehabilitation center.

Pioneer of electrified instruments
Rey amplified his banjo in the 1920s. In 1935, Gibson hired him to develop a prototype pickup with engineers at the Lyon & Healy company in Chicago, based on the one he developed for his banjo. The result was used for Gibson's first electric guitar ES-150. The prototype is kept in the Experience Music Project museum in Seattle.

In 1939, Rey invented an early version of a "talk box" device that modified the sound of his electric steel guitar to sound like words. For performances of his big band, he created an animated mechanical character he named "Stringy", shaped like a guitar, that "sang" the altered guitar sounds. A later commercial version of the talk box, using a different technology developed by Bob Heil, was made famous by guitarist Peter Frampton.

Around 1959 to 1960, Rey collaborated with composer Euel Box of PAMS Productions of Dallas to bring his distinctive pedal steel guitar sounds to radio jingles. This jingle package was part of the new Top Forty radio format and was heard on such innovative radio stations as K-BOX in Dallas and W-FUN Miami. Rey is also credited with inspiring the later, ground-breaking "Sonosational" PAMS Jingles Series 18 in 1961 which featured the talking or singing instrument effects of Rey's "sonovox".

Discography

As leader
 Swingin' Fling (Capitol, 1958)
 Refreshing Melodies (Sacred, 1958; reissued 1976)
 My Reverie (Decca, 1959)
 Ping-Pong! (Capitol, 1960)
 That Lonely Feeling (Capitol, 1960)
 Alvino Rey! ...His Greatest Hits [re-recordings] (Dot, 1961)
 As I Remember Hawaii (Dot, 1962)
 The Big Band Steel Guitar (Steel Guitar Record Club, 1977)
 Dance With Me ...The Big Band Sound of Alvino Rey (Alysa, 1978)
 The Greatest Jazz Band (Alysa, 1979)

As sideman
 Joe "Fingers" Carr, The Riotous, Raucous, Red-Hot 20's! (Warner Bros., 1961)
 George Cates, George Cates' Polynesian Percussion (Dot, 1961)
 Elvis Presley, Blue Hawaii (RCA Victor, 1961)
 Stan Kenton and Tex Ritter, Stan Kenton! Tex Ritter! (Capitol, 1962)
 Kirby Stone Four, Frank Loesser's Broadway Hit 'Guys & Dolls'  (Columbia, 1962)

References

Sources
 Jazz Journalists Association
 SpaceAgePop.com
 New York Times obituary

External links

 
Alvino Rey Interview NAMM Oral History Program (2001)

1908 births
2004 deaths
20th-century American guitarists
American jazz guitarists
American jazz bandleaders
Converts to Mormonism
American Latter Day Saints
Big band bandleaders
Pedal steel guitarists
Musicians from Oakland, California
Musicians from Salt Lake City
Capitol Records artists
Deaths from pneumonia in Utah
Amateur radio people
King family (show business)
American jazz banjoists
Guitarists from California
Guitarists from Utah
American male guitarists
Musicians from Cleveland
Burials at Cypress Lawn Memorial Park
Jazz musicians from California
Guitarists from Ohio
Jazz musicians from Ohio
20th-century American male musicians
American male jazz musicians